Pavel Vasilyevich Batyrev (13 (25) February 1897 in the village of Lopatino, Yaroslavl Governorate, Russian Empire - 14 February 1967, Leningrad, RSFSR, USSR) was a Soviet football coach. Honored Master of Sports of the USSR (1934).

He plays for Petrograd / Leningrad and the Russian Federation (1923-1929, team captain).

Champion of the RSFSR in 1924 and 1932; 2nd prize winner - 1928, 1931. 2nd prize winner of the USSR 1924, 1932 (in which - 3 matches).

In 1924-1927 he trained with the USSR national team. Member of the USSR national team travel to Turkey (1925), Germany, Austria, Latvia (1926–27), the Russian Federation team in Scandinavia, Finland, Germany, Estonia (1923).

At the same time he played for Leningrad Bandy (1922–33). Champion of the USSR in 1928, 2nd prize winner in 1924, 1933, 3rd prize winner of 1936. Champion of the RSFSR in 1924, 1926, 1927, 1928. The team of the USSR (1928) - 2 matches, 2 goals.

Playing coach (1931–35) and head coach of Dynamo (Leningrad) (1936, to June, 1939, September). The head coach of Spartak (Leningrad) (1936-1938, 1940-1941, 1946–48).

Member of the 1917 October Revolution, the deputy of the Petrograd Soviet 1919-22.

In July 1941, together with a team of  Spartak  went as a volunteer to the front in 1941-1944 fought on the Leningrad and Volkhov fronts.

Since 1968 played Batyrev Cup memory.

External links
 Profile on www.rusteam.permian.ru
 Profile on www.fifastat.ru

1897 births
1967 deaths
People from Yaroslavl Governorate
Honoured Masters of Sport of the USSR
Soviet footballers
Soviet bandy players
FC Dynamo Saint Petersburg players
Soviet football managers
FC Dynamo Saint Petersburg managers
Soviet people of World War II
Association football midfielders